José Manuel Fernández Barranquero (born 19 March 1975 in Málaga) is a paralympic athlete from Spain competing mainly in category T46 track events.

Fernandez competed in three Paralympics over varying distances.  His first games were in 1992 Summer Paralympics in his home country where he competed in the 1500m, 10000m and marathon.  In 1996 he competed in the 100m, 200m, 400m and 800m but was still unable to win that elusive medal.  However, in the 2000 Summer Paralympics he competed in the 400m, won a bronze in the 800m and was part of the silver medal-winning Spanish 400m relay team.

References

External links
 
 

1975 births
Living people
Paralympic athletes of Spain
Paralympic silver medalists for Spain
Paralympic bronze medalists for Spain
Paralympic medalists in athletics (track and field)
Athletes (track and field) at the 1992 Summer Paralympics
Athletes (track and field) at the 1996 Summer Paralympics
Athletes (track and field) at the 2000 Summer Paralympics
Medalists at the 2000 Summer Paralympics
Spanish male middle-distance runners
20th-century Spanish people
21st-century Spanish people
Spanish long-distance runners
Middle-distance runners with limb difference
Long-distance runners with limb difference
Paralympic middle-distance runners
Paralympic long-distance runners